Salem Chapel may refer to:

Chapels

Canada
British Methodist Episcopal Church, Salem Chapel, a National Historic Site of Canada in St. Catharines, Ontario

Singapore
Salem Chapel, a Christian church in Singapore

United Kingdom

England
Salem Chapel, East Budleigh, Devon
Salem Chapel, Leeds, West Yorkshire

Scotland
Salem Chapel, Dundee

Wales
Capel Salem, Llanbedr, Gwynedd, famous for its depiction in the painting Salem (1908) by Sydney Curnow Vosper
Salem Independent Chapel, Llandovery, Carmarthenshire
Capel Salem, Pwllheli, Gwynedd
Salem Chapel, Robertstown, Rhondda Cynon Taf

Other
Salem Chapel Township, Forsyth County, North Carolina
Salem Chapel, a novel by Margaret Oliphant